Stipa milleana is a species of grass in the family Poaceae.
It is found only in Ecuador.

References

milleana
Flora of Ecuador
Least concern plants
Taxonomy articles created by Polbot